The 1996 Timika shooting was a mass shooting that took place on 15 April 1996 at the Mozes Kilangin Airport, Timika, Irian Jaya (now Central Papua), Indonesia, by a member of Kopassus Sec. Lt. Sanurip. Sixteen people were killed and eleven others were injured.

Chronology
According to military spokesmen, Sanurip was reprimanded by another officer for being noisy when he awoke in a hangar that was used by the military as a commando post since the riots in Timika had erupted. As a reaction to this Sanurip began firing with his assault rifle at about 7 a.m. He first shot five other military personnel, including Lieutenant Colonel Adel Gustinigo, commander of Detachment 81, the counter-terrorist arm of the Indonesian army's elite special forces, as well as a major and captain, and then shot indiscriminately at anyone, while running out of the hangar.

Within seconds he killed 16 people – five Kopassus officers, six ABRI soldiers and five civilians, one of them New Zealander Michael Findlay, a helicopter pilot working for Airfast – and injuring another 13 people, ten ABRI officers and three civilian. Sanurip was eventually shot in the leg and subdued by other soldiers.

Motive
The motive behind the rampage was not immediately known, though it was suggested that Sanurip was suffering from depression and was not in a healthy state, perhaps due to a malaria infection.

It was further reported that an army transporter, carrying two soldiers killed in Mapenduma, made a fuel stop at Timika airport that morning, and that Sanurip began shooting after seeing their remains and realising that one of them was a friend of his, though it was stated by military spokesmen this information was not true and that there was no connection between the arrival of the bodies and the mass murder.

Also repudiated were initial reports that there was a heated argument between Sanurip and his superiors prior to the shooting.

Victims
Among those who were killed:

Lieutenant Colonel Adel Gustimigo, 37, Detachment 81/Kopassus
Major Gunawan, Detachment 81/Kopassus
Captain Djatmiko, 328th Airborne Infantry/Kostrad
Sergeant Major Yaswanto, Kopassus
First Sergeant Manasye, Komando Rayon Militer

Sergeant 2nd class Joko, 752nd Battalion/Kodam VIII/Trikora
Private Kasiyanto, 752nd Battalion/Kodam VIII/Trikora
Private Misdiyono, 752nd Battalion/Kodam VIII/Trikora
Private Mochtar, 752nd Battalion/Kodam VIII/Trikora
Private Rudy, 752nd Battalion/Kodam VIII/Trikora
Private Triyono, 752nd Battalion/Kodam VIII/Trikora

Antonio Budi Afianto, Airfast technician
Darmanto
Michael Findlay, Airfast pilot
Jimmy Watusile
Unnamed civilian

Among those wounded was Airfast employee Sarjito.

Two Kopassus and one Kostrad treated in Gatot Subroto
Civilian in Pondok Indah
Four in Jakarta.

Aftermath
Sanurip was sentenced to death by a military tribunal in Jayapura on 23 April 1997. After the decision was made public, Amnesty International uttered concerns, because the court had rejected evidence regarding Sanurip's mental health.

The Military High Court in Surabaya dismissed his appeal on 18 June 1997, and also discharged him from the Indonesian Armed Forces and ordered him to pay a nominal court fee, whereupon he lodged an appeal to the Indonesian Supreme Court. 

He later died in a hospital.

A military tribunal has sentenced to death a soldier who went on a shooting rampage in which he killed 16 people in Irian Jaya last year.

A military tribunal rejected the defence that Second Lieutenant Sanurip was suffering from malaria-induced depression

The shooting is currently the deadliest workplace shooting in modern history.

See also
 Papua conflict

References

External links
GATRA - Setelah Kata-kata Tidak Berdaya (25 May 1996)
ALMARHUM LETKOL ADEL IKUT NAIK PANGKAT (30 May 1996)
Pelaku Musibah Timika akan Segera Disidangkan (9 November 1996)
"MASIH DIGUNAKANNYA HUKUMAN MATI" (14 May 1997)
FAKSI SIAPA YANG MENEMBAK YUN HAP? (28 September 1999)
ABRI Officer Rages in Timika, Kills 14 People
Special Team Reports Timika Findings to President
Hostage Liberation TAPOL Version
Riot shuts down world's largest gold mine
Soldier to face firing squad in Indonesia

1996 in Indonesia
Papua conflict
History of Central Papua
Mass shootings in Indonesia
Timika